The 2017 FIVB Volleyball Women's U23 World Championship – European qualification was the first edition of the tournament, which was played in Serbia from 27 July to 31 July 2016.

Results 

|}

|}

Final standing

See also 
 2017 FIVB Volleyball Men's U23 World Championship – European qualification

External links 
 Official website

E